Didar Khamza (born 15 February 1997) is a Kazakhstani judoka. He won a silver medal at the 2016 Asian Judo Championships and competed at the 2016 Summer Olympics, where he was eliminated in the second round.

References

External links
 

1997 births
Living people
Kazakhstani male judoka
Olympic judoka of Kazakhstan
Judoka at the 2016 Summer Olympics
Judoka at the 2018 Asian Games
Asian Games gold medalists for Kazakhstan
Asian Games silver medalists for Kazakhstan
Asian Games medalists in judo
Medalists at the 2018 Asian Games
Judoka at the 2020 Summer Olympics
21st-century Kazakhstani people